Fernando Alves may refer to:

 Fernando Alves (footballer, born 1979), Equatoguinean football centre-back
 Fernando Alves (footballer, born 1984), Uruguayan football attacking midfielder